Araweté is a Tupi–Guaraní language of the state of Amazonas, in the Amazon region of Brazil. Nearly all speakers were monolingual in 1986.

Phonology

Vowels

Consonants

References

External links

Tupi–Guarani languages
Languages of Brazil